Diospyros penibukanensis is a tree in the family Ebenaceae. The twigs are covered with dense hairs. Inflorescences bear up to 10 crowded flowers. The tree is named for Penibukan in Malaysia's Sabah state. Its habitat is mixed dipterocarp forests. D. penibukanensis is endemic to Borneo.

References

penibukanensis
Endemic flora of Borneo
Trees of Borneo
Plants described in 1937